Luis Eduardo Mayme Quijandría (born 28 November 1980) is a Peruvian footballer who most recently played as a midfielder for Comerciantes Unidos.

Club career
Mayme played for José Gálvez FBC for the first time in 2005. He helped the Chimbote based club return to the top-flight by winning the 2005 Copa Perú division. The following season Mayme stayed with the newly promoted side and made more than 17 league appearances in the 2006 Torneo Descentralizado season. However, José Gálvez finished with the same points as Sport Boys and had to play in a Relegation Play-off, which his side lost 4–5 on penalties.

Then in January 2007 Mayme joined Peruvian giants Universitario de Deportes. He made his league debut for Universitario in the 2nd Round (Apertura) of the 2007 season at home to Sport Áncash. Manager Jorge Amado Nunes put him in the match in the 77th minute for Donny Neyra, and the match  eventually finished in a 0–0 draw. He also later played in his first Peruvian Classico derby match away to Alianza Lima in Round 17 (Apertura). He was in the starting eleven until being substituted for Marco Ruiz in the 68th minute of the match, which finished in a 1–2 win for La U. Mayme managed to make 30 league appearances for Universitario and also one Copa Sudamericana match in the 2007 season.

In January 2008 Mayme rejoined José Gálvez FBC as the club returned to the Descentralizado for the 2008 season.

Honours

Club
José Gálvez FBC
 Copa Perú: 2005
 Torneo Intermedio: 2011
 Segunda División Peruana: 2011

References

External links

1980 births
Living people
People from Pisco, Peru
Association football midfielders
Peruvian footballers
Copa Perú players
Peruvian Primera División players
Peruvian Segunda División players
José Gálvez FBC footballers
Club Universitario de Deportes footballers
Universidad Técnica de Cajamarca footballers
Comerciantes Unidos footballers